This is a list of news channels in Pakistan. These are Pakistani general, business and defunct news channels with their headquarters, launched year, closed year and languages arranged alphabetically.

General news channels

Defunct news channels

See also 
 List of television channels in Pakistan
 List of music channels in Pakistan

References 

Lists of television channels in Pakistan
Television stations in Pakistan
Mass media in Pakistan